"Hey Baby"  is a song by Jamaican dancehall recording artist Sean Paul. The song was released as a digital download on 21 February 2014 through Atlantic Records as the fifth and final single from his sixth studio album Full Frequency (2014).

Chart performance

Release history

References

2013 songs
2014 singles
Sean Paul songs
Songs written by Sean Paul
Songs written by Wayne Hector
Songs written by Toby Gad
Song recordings produced by Toby Gad